Jorge Alfonso Alejandro Del Castillo Gálvez (born 2 July 1950) is a Peruvian lawyer and politician. In his career, he has served in the now abolished Peruvian Chamber of Deputies between 1990 and 1992, in the unicameral Congress of the Republic for six non-consecutive terms, between 1995 and 2011 and again from 2016 to 2019, five of which are consecutive terms, and as Mayor of Lima and the District of Barranco during the 1980s.

An adept negotiator, he is also a prominent member of the Peruvian Aprista Party, serving in two occasions as the party's Secretary-General. As the right-hand man to the late former President Alan García, he served as his defense attorney during the first corruption and illicit enrichment allegations made in his first post-presidency, and finally as his first Prime Minister in his second presidency.

Early life and education
Born in 1950 in the Barranco District in Lima, Jorge Del Castillo pursued his elementary, middle and high school education at the Colegio San Luis of Barranco. Upon graduation, he enrolled in National University of San Marcos, studying law from 1968 to 1974. In 1994, he earned a Master's degree in Constitutional law from the Pontifical Catholic University of Peru Graduate School. Also, he holds a degree in High Direction from the University of Piura.

He became a member of the Peruvian Aprista Party while he was a law student at the National University of San Marcos, serving in the College Youth Wing.

Political career

1980s 
A prominent member of the Peruvian Aprista Party, Del Castillo was first elected to public office as a Councilman of the District of Barranco in 1981. In the 1983 municipal elections, he was elected Mayor of the same district. He held the position until 1985, when President Alan García appointed him Prefect (appointed department governor) of Lima. 

He rose to political prominence after being elected Mayor of Lima in late-1986, defeating various popular candidates such as former christian democrat Mayor from the 1960s, Luis Bedoya Reyes and incumbent Marxist Mayor Alfonso Barrantes Lingán. As Mayor, he did very little in the case of infrastructure and rehabilitation of roads, although he claimed that he couldn't do much because of the rise of terrorism.

1990s 
In 1990, he was elected to the Chamber of Deputies, serving until 1992, when President Alberto Fujimori dissolved Congress in a self-coup. During his short term in Congress, he defended APRA leader Alan García from the accusations against him involving corruption and unjust enrichment. 

Del Castillo returned to politics in 1995, when he was elected to Congress representing Lima. He was reelected for office in 2000, 2001, and 2006. In 2004, he was ratified as Secretary General of the Party for a second term (this time as Institutional Secretary General of the Party), serving until 2006, when he resigned after being named by newly elected President Alan García as his inaugural Prime Minister.

After his ousting as a Deputy, he helped García escape from Peru and find refuge in Colombia. With García in exile, Del Castillo became one of the most respected leaders of the Party, and was elected Secretary General in 1999.

2000s

For the general elections of 2000, he was a candidate for the 1st Vice Presidency of the Republic on the presidential roster of Abel Salinas Izaguirre for the APRA, however the candidacy was not successful and he was in the 4th place of the preferences.

During his work in the legislature, he showed his opposition to the Fujimori dictatorship and participated in the “March of the Four Suyos” on July 28, 2000, the same day that Alberto Fujimori assumed his third government.

In November of the same year, after the fall of the Fujimori government, his legislative position was reduced until 2001 when new general elections were called.

In the 2001 general elections, he was reelected Congressman by APRA for the 2001-2006 parliamentary term.

During his work, he was 2nd Vice President of the Congress of the Republic during the period 2001-2002; President of the Subcommission for Constitutional Reform of the Economic Regime (2001-2002), President of the Working Group on the Law of Political Parties (2002-2003) and President of the Special Commission for Investment of the Congress of the Republic in the 2004- legislatures 2005 and 2005-2006.

In 2004, he was ratified as Secretary General of the Party for a second term (this time as Institutional Secretary General of the Party), serving until 2006, when he resigned after being named by newly elected President Alan García as his inaugural Prime Minister. He served as Political Secretary General between 2010 and 2017, concurrently with the Institutional Secretary General, former Ayacucho Governor Omar Quesada.

Del Castillo was sworn in as García's Prime Minister on July 28, 2006, swearing for Víctor Raúl Haya de la Torre and "APRA martyrs blood". During his premiership, he gave political and economic stability to the country, generating confidence with Congress, making agreements with various unions and successfully managing social conflicts within the country. 

After the "Petroaudios" scandal revealed Del Castillo's involvement, he tendered his resignation with the whole cabinet on October 10, 2008, to President Alan García, marking his political downfall.

2010s
Del Castillo served in Congress until 2011, after failing to achieve a fifth consecutive reelection. He served as Political Secretary General between 2010 and 2017, concurrently with the Institutional Secretary General, former Ayacucho Governor Omar Quesada.

In the 2016 general election, Del Castillo was reelected for a fifth term in Congress, returning after 5 years of absence under the Popular Alliance. By law, he cannot run again for reelection since the approval of the third clause of the 2018 constitutional referendum, which states the prohibition of immediate reelection for congressman.

His final tenure in office ended with the dissolution of Congress by Martín Vizcarra.  He served a total of 19 years in Congress.

Offices

Public
 District Councilman of Barranco (1981-1983)
 Mayor of the District of Barranco (1984-1986)
 Prefect of the Department of Lima (1985-1986)
 Metropolitan Mayor of Lima (1987-1989)
 Chairman of Association of Municipalities of Peru (1987-1989)
 Member of the Chamber of Deputies (1990-1992)
 Member of Congress (1995-2000) (2000-2001) (2001-2006) (2006-2011) (2p16-2018)
 Second Vice President of Congress (2001-2002)
 President of the Council of Ministers (2006-2008)

Party
 Secretary General of the District Executive Committee - Barranco (1982)
 Chairman of the National Political Commission (1993-1995)
 Secretary General of the National Executive Committee (1999-2004) (2004-2006)
 Candidate for the First Vice Presidency of the Republic of Peru (2000)
 Candidate for the Second Vice Presidency of the Republic of Peru (2001)
 Political Secretary General of the National Executive Committee (2010-)

See also
2008 Peru oil scandal

References

External links
Official Congress Profile Congress of the Republic of Peru
Peruvian Aprista Party Official Site

People from Lima
1950 births
Mayors of Lima
Living people
Prime Ministers of Peru
American Popular Revolutionary Alliance politicians
Members of the Congress of the Republic of Peru
National University of San Marcos alumni
Pontifical Catholic University of Peru alumni
University of Piura alumni